Marino Marini (11 May 1924 – 20 March 1997) was an Italian musician who achieved international success in the 1950s and 1960s.

Biography
He was born into a family of musicians in Seggiano in the province of Grosseto to parents originally from Montecelio, Lazio. After briefly studying electronics, he studied piano, violin and composition at the Conservatorio Rossini at Bologna, teaching music on his graduation. In 1947, after military service, he was appointed artistic director of  the Metropolitan music hall in Naples, where he developed a liking for Neapolitan music.  In 1948 he visited the United States for six months, meeting Dizzy Gillespie,  Stan Kenton and Charlie Ventura.  American jazz was also a formative influence.

On his return, Marini wrote music for films and revues and played in cabaret in Rome and Naples.

In 1954, he placed a newspaper advert seeking “young musicians without experience, singing in tune. If not cheerful, don't apply." From the many applicants he chose Gaetano “Totò” Savio (guitar),  Sergio (drums) and Ruggero Cori (bass and vocal) for a quartet, Marini playing piano and occasionally singing solo. This quartet played together from 1954 to 1960, a period regarded as the Marino Marini Quartet's most prolific and successful.

They made their first recording on the Durium label in 1955.  The following year they appeared on Italian TV.  Their recordings of "Guaglione", "Don Ciccio o' piscatore",  "Rico Vacilon", "La Pansè", and "Maruzzella" were very popular, "Guaglione" becoming the first European single to sell more than five million copies.  (It was used on the soundtrack of the 1999 film The Talented Mr. Ripley.)  Following this successful debut, Marini commenced touring with his quartet, in the following years performing in hundreds of concerts in western and eastern Europe, the US, the Middle East and Japan.

Marini's recordings in the late 1950s and early 1960s included covers of  Domenico Modugno's  "Volare" and "Ciao ciao bambina" and Rocco Granata's "Marina".  In 1960, he won the first and the second prizes in the Naples song festival with "Serenata a Margellina" and "Uè uè uè che femmena". In 1958 he performed Mikis Theodorakis's "The Honeymoon Song" in  Michael Powell's film Honeymoon.

In 1960 the first quartet disbanded and in 1961 new quartet was formed with Marini, Bruno Guarnera (guitar), Pepito di Pace (drums) and Vittorio Benvenuti (bass, vocal, dance).   The quartet was re-formed again in 1963 with Francesco Ventura (guitar), Sergio (drums), and Franco Cesarico (bass guitar and vocal).

Marino Marini's music was rooted in the tradition of Italian song, and in particular Neapolitan song, as he sometimes performed in the Neapolitan language (e.g. "Maruzzella").  Many of his numbers are in 4/4 or 4/8 time, but he sometimes used the 6/8 tarantella rhythm with an off-beat tempo accentuated by the piano on the second and fourth beat.  He performed in several styles and genres, reinterpreting American standards or current pop songs  (e.g. "Just Young") and using dance rhythms such as cha-cha-cha, the twist, the letkiss and the samba.  He often combined genres (e.g. Neapolitan song and samba in "Ciccio 'o piscatore").

He made innovative use of the echo chamber (using one made to his own design) and is said to have been the first European performer to use sound mixing on stage, anticipating the techniques used by rock musicians in the 1960s.

Among the performers he influenced were the French singer Dalida and the French-Italian Caterina Valente.

He retired from performing in 1966 but continued to compose.  He died in March 1997.

References

1924 births
1997 deaths
People from the Province of Grosseto
Italian pop musicians
Italian bandleaders
Neapolitan language
Italian male singer-songwriters
20th-century Italian male singers